Novinci is a settlement in the Municipality of Sveti Andraž v Slovenskih Goricah in northeastern Slovenia. It lies in the Slovene Hills in the traditional region of Styria. The municipality is now included in the Drava Statistical Region.

References

External links
Novinci at Geopedia

Populated places in the Municipality of Sveti Andraž v Slovenskih Goricah